May 4 - Eastern Orthodox Church calendar - May 6

All fixed commemorations below celebrated on May 18 by Orthodox Churches on the Old Calendar.

For May 5th, Orthodox Churches on the Old Calendar commemorate the Saints listed on April 22.

Saints
 Great Virgin-martyr Irene of Thessaloniki (4th century)
 Martyrs Irenaeus, Pellegrinus and Irene, at Thessaloniki (284–305)
 Martyrs Neophytus, Gaius, and Gaianus
 Saint Eulogius the Confessor, bishop of Edessa (c. 386)
 Saints Martin and Heraclius, of Illyria (4th century)
 Saint Euthymius the Wonderworker, bishop of Madytos on the Hellespont (c. 990)

Pre-Schism Western saints
 Martyr Jovinian, the lector of St. Peregrine of Auxerre (c. 304)
 Saint Brito (Britonius) (386)
 Saint Nectarius of Vienne, bishop of Vienne (c. 445)
 Saint Nicetus of Vienne, fifteenth bishop of Vienne (c. 449)
 Saint Hilarion, Archbishop of Arles (449)
 Saint Gerontius of Milan (470)
 Martyr Crescentiana of Rome (5th century)
 Saint Hydrock (Hydroc) of Cornwall (5th century)
 Saint Sacerdos of Saguntum (c. 560)
 Saint Waldrada, first abbess of Saint-Pierre-aux-Nonnains in Metz in France (c. 620)
 Saint Maurontius of Douai (Maurontus, Mauront), founded monastery at Breuil-sur-lys near Douai, of which he is the patron-saint (701)
 Saint Echa of Crayke, (Etha), Anglo-Saxon priest and monk-hermit at Crayke, near York, England (767)

Post-Schism Orthodox saints
 Saints Barlaam of Serpukhov, and Gideon of Serpukhov (1377)
 New Monk-martyr Ephraim of Nea Makri (1426)
 Saint Adrian, abbot of Monza Monastery (1619)

New martyrs and confessors
 New Hieromartyr Nicholas, priest (1919)
 New Hieromartyr Platon of Banja Luka (Platon Jovanovic) (1941)  (see also: April 22)

Other commemorations
 Translation of the relics (980) of Saint Aldhelm, Bishop of Sherborne (709)
 Uncovering of the relics (1613) of Saint James of Zheleznoborov, Abbot of Zhelezny Bor (1442)
 Icon of the Most Holy Theotokos "Inexhaustible Cup" (1878)

Icon gallery

Notes

References

Sources
 May 5/18, Orthodox Calendar (PRAVOSLAVIE.RU)
 May 18, 2011 / May 5, HOLY TRINITY RUSSIAN ORTHODOX CHURCH (A parish of the Patriarchate of Moscow)
 May 5, OCA - The Lives of the Saints.
 May 5. Latin Saints of the Orthodox Patriarchate of Rome.
 May 5. The Roman Martyrology.
Greek Sources
 Great Synaxaristes:  5 ΜΑΪΟΥ, ΜΕΓΑΣ ΣΥΝΑΞΑΡΙΣΤΗΣ.
  Συναξαριστής. 5 Μαΐου. ECCLESIA.GR. (H ΕΚΚΛΗΣΙΑ ΤΗΣ ΕΛΛΑΔΟΣ). 
Russian Sources
  18 мая (5 мая). Православная Энциклопедия под редакцией Патриарха Московского и всея Руси Кирилла (электронная версия). (Orthodox Encyclopedia - Pravenc.ru).
  5 мая (ст.ст.) 18 мая 2013 (нов. ст.). Русская Православная Церковь Отдел внешних церковных связей. (DECR).

May in the Eastern Orthodox calendar